Lea Antonoplis and Barbara Jordan were the defending champions and won in the final 6–3, 6–4 against Sherry Acker and Ann Henricksson.

Seeds
Champion seeds are indicated in bold text while text in italics indicates the round in which those seeds were eliminated.

 Lea Antonoplis /  Barbara Jordan (champions)
 Patricia Medrado /  Cláudia Monteiro (first round)
 Alycia Moulton /  Betsy Nagelsen (first round)
 Susan Mascarin /  Anne White (quarterfinals)

Draw

References
 1983 Virginia Slims of Pennsylvania Doubles Draw

Virginia Slims of Pennsylvania
1983 Virginia Slims World Championship Series